The sharpbill (Oxyruncus cristatus) is a small passerine bird in the family Tityridae. Its range is from the mountainous areas of tropical South America and southern Central America (Panama and Costa Rica).

It inhabits the canopy of wet forest and feeds on fruit and some invertebrates. It has an orange erectile crest, black-spotted yellowish underparts and scaling on the head and neck. As its name implies, it has a straight, pointed beak, which gives its common name.

Sharpbills are most commonly found in tall dense forests but occasionally venture to the forest edge. Their diet consists of primarily of fruit, but they will also take insects, hanging upside down in from twigs to obtain insect larvae. They will also travel in mixed-species feeding flocks with ovenbirds, tanagers, woodpeckers and cotingas. The breeding system employed by this species is polygamous with closely grouped males displaying in from a lek. The nest of the sharpbill is built by the female and is a small cup built on a slender branch. Chicks are fed by regurgitation.

The genus Oxyruncus was erected by the Dutch zoologist Coenraad Jacob Temminck in 1820. The sharpbill was described in 1821 by the English naturalist William John Swainson under the binomial name Oxyrhuncus cristatus with an "h" inserted into the name of the genus. The word Oxyruncus is from the Ancient Greek oxus for "sharp" or "pointed" and rhunkhos "bill". The specific epithet is from the Latin cristatus for "crested" or "plumed".

Molecular phylogenetic studies have shown that the sharpbill occupies a basal position in a clade containing the Tityridae. The sharpbill is sometimes placed in its own family Oxyruncidae.

There are four subspecies:
 Oxyruncus cristatus frater (Sclater, PL & Salvin, 1868) – Costa Rica and west Panama
 Oxyruncus cristatus brooksi Bangs & Barbour, 1922 – east Panama
 Oxyruncus cristatus hypoglaucus (Salvin & Godman, 1883) – southeast Venezuela, the Guianas and north Brazil
 Oxyruncus cristatus cristatus Swainson, 1821 – southeast Brazil, east Paraguay and northeast Argentina

References

 Charles G. Sibley; Scott M. Lanyon; Jon E. Ahlquist (1984) "The relationships of the Sharpbill (Oxyruncus cristatus)" Condor 86(1) 48–52.

External links
Image at ADW

Birds of Costa Rica
Birds of Panama
Birds of Brazil
Birds of the Peruvian Amazon
Birds of the Guianas
Birds of the Atlantic Forest
Birds described in 1821
Taxa named by William John Swainson
Tityridae